Jay Ramirez (born 1985) is a Colombian born Speed skater.

Early life

Born in Anserma, Colombia, Jay Ramirez moved to London at the age of 12 and trained as a figure skater at the Queensway Ice Rink.

Career

References

External links
 
 

1985 births
Living people
People from Caldas Department
Colombian emigrants to the Netherlands
Colombian male speed skaters
Colombian emigrants to England
Sportspeople from London
British male speed skaters